Monte Carlo is a motor yacht in the superyacht category.  She was named after the Monte Carlo quarter of Monaco.

History
Monte Carlo was built by Amels in their Hakvoort shipyard in The Netherlands and launched in 1988. She was designed by Diana Yacht Design BV. She underwent an extensive refit in 1999 (including an interior refit designed by Dee Robinson), and lesser refits in 2004 and 2006.

Monte Carlo currently cruises the Mediterranean Sea in the Summer cruising season, and the Caribbean in the Winter cruising season, crossing the Atlantic Ocean twice each year. 

The vessel is powered by twin 1,550hp MTU engines, and has a range of 4000 nautical miles at 10.8 knots.

Notable passengers
 Pierce Brosnan, actor
 Mariah Carey, pop and R&B singer

References

 Boat International Publications Authors, The Superyachts, Volume Eighteen. Kingston upon Thames, Boat International Publications (2004) 
 Cayman Islands Shipping Registry, Certificate of British Registry, Official Number: 731192

Individual yachts
1988 ships
Ships built in the Netherlands